Posht Tang-e Dar Vazneh is a village in Kakavand-e Sharqi Rural District, Kakavand District, Delfan County, Lorestan Province, Iran. At the 2006 census, its population was 234, in 46 families.

References 

Towns and villages in Delfan County